Red Cross Red Crescent is the official magazine for the International Red Cross Red Crescent movement, published jointly by the International Committee of the Red Cross and the International Federation of Red Cross and Red Crescent National Societies, both based in Geneva, Switzerland. The magazine was launched in 1987. It is published three times a year in Arabic, Chinese, English, French, Russian and Spanish and is available in 190 countries, with a circulation of more than 70,000.

References

External links

International Red Cross and Red Crescent Movement
Magazines established in 1987
Magazines published in Geneva
Multilingual magazines
Triannual magazines